The Australasian Conference on Information Systems (ACIS) is an annual conference for Information Systems and Information Technology academics and professionals and is affiliated with the Australasian Association for Information Systems. ACIS is the premier Information Systems conference within Australia and New Zealand, targeting Information Systems academics and researchers. It covers technical, organisational, business and social issues in the application of Information Technology(IT) to real world problems.

ACIS provides a platform for panel discussions and the presentation of peer-reviewed information systems research papers.

The conference attracts over a hundred submissions each year, and those that are selected for presentation appear in the 'ACIS Proceedings’, which have been archived online since 2001.

The first Australian Conference in Information Systems (ACIS) took place in 1990 at Monash University and was chaired by Ross Jeffery. The name was changed to the Australasian Conference on Information Systems in 1994 to reflect the involvement of New Zealand, and attendance stabilised at approximately 250 delegates by 2007, having reached its peak in 2000.

The ACIS logo consists of a digital pixel background pattern with a human hand silhouette and a swooping arrow.

ACIS Venues

The following table displays a list of past and near future ACIS conferences.

See also
Association for Information Systems
Information Systems
Management Information Systems

References

External links
ACIS E-Library of Proceedings
Association for Information Systems 

Information systems conferences